Beethoven Hall (1874-1878) was an auditorium in Boston, Massachusetts, that hosted musical performances and other entertainments in the 1870s. It sat on Washington Street, near Boylston Street, in today's Boston Theater District/Chinatown neighborhood. The architect was William Washburn, who had also designed the first National Theatre and the second Tremont Temple. 

In 1879 the renovated hall re-opened as the Park Theatre. The building survived until 1990, when it was razed.

Performances

 Annie de Montford, mesmerist
 Charlotte Cushman
 Mrs. Adelia Dauncey Maskell ("celebrated English Star Reader")
 Berger Family and Sol Smith Russell
 Buckley's Serenaders
 Callender's Georgia Minstrels
 Marius Cazeneuve's "grand soirees of prestidigitation and anti-spiritualistic seances"
 Buffalo Bill combination
 Tomasi's Grand Juvenile English Opera
 Brown's Brigade Band
 Lingards and Company
 G.B. Bunnell's "living human wonders from the New American Museum, New York City"

References

Demolished buildings and structures in Boston
1874 establishments in Massachusetts
1878 disestablishments
Cultural history of Boston
19th century in Boston
Former theatres in Boston
Event venues established in 1874
Boston Theater District
Buildings and structures demolished in 1990